In enzymology, an UDP-glucuronate 5'-epimerase is an enzyme that catalyzes the chemical reaction

UDP-glucuronate  UDP-L-iduronate

Hence, this enzyme has one substrate, UDP-glucuronate, and one product, UDP-L-iduronate.

This enzyme belongs to the family of isomerases, specifically those racemases and epimerases acting on carbohydrates and derivatives.  The systematic name of this enzyme class is UDP-glucuronate 5'-epimerase. Other names in common use include uridine diphosphoglucuronate 5'-epimerase, UDP-glucuronic acid 5'-epimerase, and C-5-uronosyl epimerase.  This enzyme participates in nucleotide sugars metabolism.  It employs one cofactor, NAD+.

References 

 

EC 5.1.3
NADH-dependent enzymes
Enzymes of unknown structure